The  Ansel Adams Award for Photography, formally called  Ansel Adams Award for Conservation Photography, named in honor of American photographer Ansel Adams, is a photography award administered by the Sierra Club. The award "honor[s] photographers who have used their talents in conservation efforts."

List of recipients

1971 — Donald M. Bradburn
1972 — Beverly Steveson
1973 — Leonard Berkowitz (1919-2007)
1974 — Bruce Barnbaum
1976 — C. Scott Heppel
1978 — C.C. Lockwood
1981 — Ernie Day
1983 — Dewitt Jones
1984 — Galen Rowell
1985 — Tupper Ansel Blake
1986 — Robert M. Lindholm
1988 — Tom Algire
1989 — Robert Glenn Ketchum
1990 — Edward Schell
1991 — Stephen Trimble
1992 — J. D. Marston
1993 — John Fielder
1995 — William Neill
1997 — Frans Lanting
1998 — Jim Stimson
2000 — Clyde Butcher
2001 — Robin Way
2002 — Jack Jeffrey
2003 — Douglas Steakley
2004 — Ken Adelman and Gabrielle Adelman
2005 — Larry Allen
2006 — Gary Braasch
2007 — Wilbur Mills
2008 — Steven Kazlowski
2009 — Joshua Wolfe
2010 — Chris Jordan
2011 — Ian Shive
2012 — Florian Schulz
2013 — James Balog
2014 — Krista Schlyer
2015 — Boyd Norton
2016 — Nick Brandt
2017 — Michael Forsberg
2018 —  Thomas D. Mangelsen
2019  — Tim Palmer
2020  — Rob Badger and Nita Winter
2021 — Joel Sartore
2022 — QT Luong

See also
 Conservation in the United States
 List of environmental awards

Notes

Awards established in 1971
Photography awards
Sierra Club
Environmental awards
Nature conservation in the United States
 
Ansel Adams